

Events
Sicilian Mafia Don Vito Cascio Ferro is arrested by Benito Mussolini and imprisoned. Casio Ferro would remain in prison until his death in 1945.
John Tuccello, a gunman for the Sheldon Gang, is killed by members of the Saltis-McErlane gang.
January 10 – Henry Spingola, brother-in-law to the six Genna Brothers of the Genna crime family, is killed by members of the Chicago Outfit.
February 15 – Urazio "The Scourge" Tropea, an associate of the Genna crime family, is gunned down in a drive-by shooting by unidentified gunmen.
February 21 – Genna crime family ally Vito Bascone, a Chicago West Side bootlegger, is killed in Stickney, Illinois.
February 23 – Genna crime family member Edward Baldelli is found in a ditch outside Chicago.
April – Saltis-McErlane Gang members hijack a Sheldon Gang beer shipment.

September 20 – Members of the North Side Gang, including George "Bugs" Moran, Earl "Hymie" Weiss, Vincent "The Schemer" Drucci, Peter Gusenberg, and Frank "Tight Lips" Gusenberg attempt to kill Al Capone in a drive-by shooting at Capone's Cicero headquarters, firing hundreds of rounds. Although unharmed, Capone is terrified and requests a truce.
October 11 – While meeting with Chicago lawyer William W. O'Brian, North Side Gang leader Hymie Weiss is killed in an ambush outside Holy Name Cathedral, Chicago, with bodyguard Patrick Murray.  North Side Gang members Benny Jacobs and Sam Pellar are severely wounded. With Weiss's death, Vincent "The Schemer" Drucci assumes gang leadership.
October 20 – John "Dingbat" O'Berta and Joseph "Polack Joe" Saltis call a peace conference in an attempt to broker a ceasefire among Chicago's major bootleggers. With the establishment of Madison Street as dividing the Chicago Outfit and the North Side Gang territories, the two sides agree to peace.
December 30 – The Chicago gang ceasefire is broken when Sheldon Gang member Hillary Clements is killed by the Saltis-McErlane Gang.

Arts and literature
The Gangs of New York by Herbert Asbury.

Deaths
John Tuccello, Sheldon Gang member
January 10 – Henry Spingola, brother-in-law to the six Genna Brothers of the Genna crime family
February 15 – Urazio Tropea "The Scourge", associate of the Genna crime family
February 23 – Edward Baldelli, Genna crime family member
February 24 – Vito Bascone, Chicago bootlegger and Genna crime family ally
August 6 – John "Mitters" Foley, Chicago bootlegger
October 11 – Hymie Weiss, North Side Gang leader, and his associate/bodyguard Patrick Murray 
December 30 – Hillary Clements, Sheldon Gang member

Organized crime
Years in organized crime